James Lee Carragher (born 11 November 2002) is an English professional footballer who plays as a centre-back for Wigan Athletic of the Sky Bet Championship

Early and personal life
James Lee Carragher was born on 11 November 2002 in Liverpool, Merseyside. He is the son of the former footballer Jamie Carragher.

Career
Carragher began playing football with Liverpool as an under-8 in 2011. He joined the youth academy of Wigan Athletic in 2017. Carragher captained Wigan's under-18s as they won the U18 Professional Development League in the 2020–21 season. He signed his first professional contract with Wigan on 4 August 2021. He made his debut with Wigan Athletic in a 1–1 (7–8) EFL Cup penalty shoot-out win over Hull City on 10 August 2021.

Carragher joined National League club Oldham Athletic on 16 September 2022 on loan until 1 January 2023.

Career statistics

References

External links
Profile at the Wigan Athletic F.C. website
Profile at the Oldham Athletic A.F.C. website

2002 births
Living people
Footballers from Liverpool
English footballers
Association football defenders
Wigan Athletic F.C. players
Oldham Athletic A.F.C. players
National League (English football) players